Preston Thomas Parsons (born February 19, 1979) is a former American football quarterback. He was signed by the Arizona Cardinals as an undrafted free agent in 2002. He played college football at Northern Arizona.

Parsons has also been a member of the Houston Texans, Denver Broncos and Tennessee Titans. His attempts to make the Broncos roster in 2006 was chronicled in Stefan Fatsis's book A Few Seconds of Panic.

Early years
Preston Parsons attended Jesuit High School in Portland, Oregon, graduating in 1997. While there he earned three varsity letters in football, two in basketball, and one each in baseball and golf. In football, he was a USA Today All-USA selection.

References

External links
Denver Broncos bio
Tennessee Titans bio

1979 births
Living people
American football quarterbacks
Northern Arizona Lumberjacks football players
Arizona Cardinals players
Denver Broncos players
Houston Texans players
Tennessee Titans players
Players of American football from Portland, Oregon
Jesuit High School (Beaverton, Oregon) alumni